Onionhead is a 1958 comedy-drama film set on a U.S. Coast Guard ship during World War II, starring Andy Griffith and featuring Felicia Farr, Walter Matthau, Erin O'Brien, James Gregory,  Joey Bishop, and Claude Akins. It was directed by Norman Taurog and was written by Nelson Gidding and Weldon Hill from Hill's novel. Weldon Hill was the pseudonym of William R. Scott, a native Oklahoman who based the novel on his own World War II service in the Coast Guard.

Griffith had experienced success with his previous service comedy, No Time for Sergeants, and Onionhead was an attempt to cash in on that success. It was marketed as an uproarious comedy but is actually a comedy drama with some fairly dark themes. Onionhead was such a notorious flop that it drove Griffith into television, according to Griffith's videotaped interview in the Archive of American Television.

Plot
In the spring of 1941, Al Woods quits an Oklahoma college to join the armed forces after a quarrel with his co-ed sweetheart, Jo. He joins the Coast Guard, partly by chance due to the flip of a coin.  After boot training, Al is assigned to a buoy tender in Boston, the Periwinkle, as a ship's cook although he has no cooking experience. He encounters immediate hostility from the chief of the galley, Red Wildoe, from new crew mates and cooks' helpers Gutsell and Poznicki, and from his arrogant department head, Lieutenant (junior grade) Higgins.

In a Boston bar, Al picks up Stella, who appears to do this kind of thing with some regularity. They develop a strong attraction, but she seems to be holding out for something more.  He befriends Gutsell by fixing him up with a girlfriend of Stella's and learns from Wildoe how to be a ship's cook, making a number of embarrassing mistakes. Al, frustrated after Stella won't spend a night in a hotel room with him, stops seeing her, whereupon he and the alcoholic Wildoe get drunk together and bond. Wildoe begins seeing Stella with Al's blessing.  Pearl Harbor is attacked and war declared.  Wildoe abruptly proposes to Stella and they marry. A free-for-all breaks out at their wedding celebration, with a jealous Al instigating a fight with soldiers who are clearly familiar with Stella already.  Wildoe is assigned to another vessel performing convoy duty at sea. During this time, Stella begins seeing other men. Al tries to prevent this on Wildoe's behalf, but can't resist Stella himself.

Aboard the Periwinkle, Al becomes the new chief cook. Higgins, promoted to executive officer, is discovered entering lesser amounts than they pay for the cost of officers' meals into the ledger of the ship's mess and pocketing the difference.  He purchases substandard food for the crew in order to keep the mess budget from showing a deficit. Higgins also objects to finding Al's hair in his food, so Al shaves his scalp bald, earning the nickname "Onionhead."  Assuming erroneously that all the officers are in on the scam, Al bypasses channels to report the theft to the District Office.  During leave back home to attend his father's funeral, Al reconnects with Jo, realizing that she is the one he loves. In port again, Wildoe asks Al to take Stella home from the bar one night when he is recalled to his ship. Stella tries to seduce Al, who calls her a tramp. She replies: "I can't help what I am."

The Periwinkle sinks a submarine in combat, with Al playing a major role, but his accusation of embezzlement impugns the honor of the innocent captain and exposes the ship to scandal at the board of investigation.  Al declines to produce any proof of Higgins' misdeeds in order to save their reputations, but privately slips the captain the proof.  In a meeting with Al and the executive officer, the captain tells Al that his punishment for an unsubstantiated allegation against an officer is loss of his rating and reassignment to Greenland, but also informs Higgins that he will have to repay every embezzled dollar before his court-martial.  He gently chastises Al for not having come to him with the proof earlier, but gives him leave to marry Jo before he ships out for Greenland.

Cast

Andy Griffith as Al Woods
Felicia Farr as Stella
Walter Matthau as Red Wildoe
Erin O'Brien as Jo Hill
James Gregory as the Skipper
Joey Bishop as Sidney Gutsell
Roscoe Karns as Windy Woods
Claude Akins as Poznicki
Ray Danton as Higgins
Sean Garrison as Yeoman Kaffhamp
Dan Barton as Ensign Fineberg
Ainslie Pryor as Chief Miller

Production
Filming on Onionhead was held up for a week in November 1957 when Andy Griffith came down with a virulent flu from the "Asian flu" pandemic. The film was shot at Warner Bros.' studio in Burbank, California; location shooting for the film took place at the Coast Guard station in Alameda, California, aboard USCGC Yamacraw (WARC-333), at Coast Guard Base Yerba Buena Island and in Long Beach, California for interiors on USCGC Heather (WAGL-331).

See also
 List of American films of 1958

References
Notes

External links 
 
 
 
 

1958 films
1958 comedy-drama films
American comedy-drama films
American black-and-white films
1950s English-language films
Films about the United States Coast Guard
Films based on American novels
Films directed by Norman Taurog
Military humor in film
Warner Bros. films
American World War II films
1958 comedy films
1958 drama films
1950s American films